M1 FILM is a Croatian commercial cable television movie channel based in Zagreb, Croatia. The program is mainly produced in Croatian and it is available via cable systems and IPTV platforms throughout the Bosnia and Herzegovina and Croatia.

M1 FILM cooperates with several film studios and distributors in Croatia and abroad whose rich film catalog make quality films for a wide audience, selected films European and Asian cinema, and animated films for children and award-winning documentaries.

References

External links 
 M1 Film
 M1 FILM in Facebook

Mass media in Sarajevo
Movie channels
Television stations in Bosnia and Herzegovina